Ricardo Javier Cruz González (born 30 August 1997) is a Mexican professional footballer who plays as a midfielder for Tritones Vallarta.

Club career

Chiapas
Cruz debuted on 12 March 2014 in the Copa MX against Veracruz. His debut in Liga MX was on 25 October 2015 against U. de G.

América
On 9 June 2016, Cruz was loaned to league giants América.

References

External links
 

1997 births
Living people
Association football forwards
Chiapas F.C. footballers
Cafetaleros de Chiapas footballers
Deportivo Toluca F.C. players
Liga MX players
Ascenso MX players
Footballers from Colima
Mexican footballers
Sportspeople from Manzanillo, Colima